Ihab Darwish is an Emirati composer, Universal Music Artist, and Recording Academy voting member. Darwish has been playing music since the age of ten and grew up in a family that supported his passion for music and composing.  He received his Bachelors in Advertising and Art Design from the Lebanese American University in Beirut.Years after graduation, Darwish designed and created his own home recording studio equipped with state of the art instruments and technology. He has experimented with music for years, working mainly in the genre of classical music.

Career
In 2017 Darwish's music was performed by the Beethoven Academy Orchestra in Poland, recorded in the Alvernia Studios. For the first time, his music was played by an orchestra of more than 140 musicians and represented a pivotal moment in his career. His first album "Waves of My Life" was launched in early 2018 and distributed across international digital music platforms by Universal Music MENA. In March 2018, Ihab Darwish received the title of “First Guest Composer” of the Beethoven Academy Orchestra.

After years of preparation, Ihab Darwish debuted his first complete orchestral work, Waves of my Life: Every Real Story Begins with a Note, with a world premiere performance at Abu Dhabi Festival on March 14, 2018 at Emirates Palace captivating the audience with a high class symphonic and cinematic concert.

In 2020 Darwish was commissioned by The Palm Fountain (Dubai, UAE) - world’s largest fountain by the Guinness Book of World Record, to compose an official musical theme “Aim For The Sky” as a sonic brand and its signature music. The composition pays homage to the UAE's culture as well as capture Dubai's cosmopolitanism and is performed regularly at The Palm Fountain at The Pointe, Dubai, from  December 1, 2020.

In 2021 Darwish performed at Abu Dhabi Festival with his symphonic work Hekayat: Symphonic Tales. Hekayat, which means tales in English, makes history as the first performance of its kind by an Emirati artist. In a marvel of technological sophistication, the performers, recorded separately in their countries, will appear together as one orchestra on the stage of Abu Dhabi’s luxurious Emirates Palace Auditorium. Ihab Darwish brings together a powerhouse group of international musicians, including Poland’s acclaimed Beethoven Academy Orchestra, conducted by maestro Tomasz Tokarczyk, VOX Chamber Choir, tenor José Cura, virtuoso musicians Sara Andon, Kodō, Carlos Piñana, Dharni, John Beasley and Kinan Azmeh as part of Abu Dhabi Festival’s commitment to cultural diplomacy and mission to supporting the growth of the performing arts in the United Arab Emirates and at a global level. With musicians, performers and the orchestra filmed individually in 21 cities around the world, the symphony required 675 zoom sessions and 86,600 man-hours of planning and production. The individual performances were synchronized digitally, and innovative post-production technology placed all 128 artists on a virtual 3D model of the stage.

In June 2022 Ihab Darwish became the first Emirati invited to be a voting member of the Grammy Recording Academy.

Albums
Album Waves of My Life. Every real story begins with a note (2018) contains nine musical pieces.
 Beyond Limits - Abu Dhabi Renaissance
 Chords of Reverie
 Desert Knight
 Lawlaki (Feat. Sammy Clark)
 The Euphony
 Arabesco
 Waves of My Life
 She
 Lawlaki (Instrumental)

2nd Album Hekayat: Symphonic Tales (2020) contains 13 pieces:

 Hekayat
 Danza Del Sol
 Across the Skies
 New Moon
 Ya Bahr
 The Wanderer
 Nova Duetto
 Gazelle Eyes
 Zahra
 Galactic Hope
 Serenade Of My Heart
 New Dawn
 Ensemble Of Peace

References

External links
 Ihab Darwish website

Emirati composers
Year of birth missing (living people)
Living people
Lebanese American University alumni